The Phoebe Allen's Hummingbird Webcam is a live webcam of an Allen's hummingbird nest located in Rose Bush Estates, Irvine, California.  The webcam was started in 2007 and it is hosted by ustream.  The hummingbird, named Phoebe, is the owner of the nest and returns to lay 4 to 5 broods per year.

References

External links
 Their website

Webcams
Hummingbirds